This list of Vogue Singapore cover models is a catalog of cover models who have appeared on the cover of Vogue Singapore, the Singaporean edition of Vogue magazine, starting when the magazine was relaunched in September 2020.

2020

2021

2022

2023

External links 
 Vogue Singapore
 Vogue Singapore at Models.com

Singapore
Vogue
Singaporean fashion